Miguel de la Quadra-Salcedo y Gayarre (30 April 1932 – 20 May 2016) was a Spanish reporter and Olympic athlete. He was the director and founder of cultural program Aventura 92 (Adventures 92), nowadays named as Ruta Quetzal BBVA. Although he was born in Madrid, he was always recognized as Basque-Navarre.

Biography

Early beginnings as a successful athlete 

Miguel de la Quadra-Salcedo was born in Madrid on 30 April 1932. When he was a child, he went to live with his family in Pamplona, where he studied to be an agricultural expert and stood out as a great athlete.
In the mid 50s Miguel and Félix Erausquin, a pitcher of the Basque bar, adapted the Basque technique to the throwing of Olympic javelin. In the manner of the disk or hammer, pitcher turns on itself before throwing. After much training, Miguel de la Quadra-Salcedo presented the "Spanish style" of throwing the javelin. The effectiveness was that high that in 1956 added 20 meters to the world record, which at the time was around 80.
However, the record was never approved by the IAAF (International Association of Athletics Federations). It thought that launch was too dangerous for the public because during the rotation the javelin tip was focused to them.

He was nine times champion of Spain in the javelin, hammer and discus, being able to compete in the 1960 Rome Olympics.
Between 1961 and 1963 he worked for the Colombian government as ethnobotany in the Amazon region.

First steps in the journalism world 
Later he became a reporter for TVE, where would cover wars such as the Congo (he was sentenced to death for filming the execution of 300 prisoners), Vietnam, Eritrea and Mozambique and events such as the death of Che Guevara (1967) or the Pinochet coup in Chile (1973). Salvador Allende, Pablo Neruda, Indira Gandhi, Haile Selassie, Norodom Sihanouk, Yassir Arafat and the 14th Dalai Lama are among the personalities interviewed by him in his time as a reporter.
He subsequently participated in programs such as Los reporteros ("The reporters") (with Félix Rodríguez de la Fuente, César Pérez de Tudela, Manu Leguineche and Jesús González Green) and Aventura 92 ("Adventure 92") (known in its current form as 'Ruta Quetzal'), consisting of the youth exchange students from Spain and Latin America to promote mutual understanding between the two sides of the Atlantic. Another program that he worked for was A la caza del tesoro ("Treasure Hunt"), presented by Isabel Tenaille: Miguel traveled by helicopter somewhere in the world following the instructions of a contestant who was in the studio in Madrid.

Ruta Quetzal 
New Generations know him as a television character, always traveling the world or as a captain of Ruta Quetzal. The Ruta Quetzal was created suggested by the King of Spain in 1979, with the aim of strengthening the Latin American Community of Nations in the young people between 16 and 17 years old among all Spanish-speaking countries. For 15 years, 7,000 young Europeans and Americans have had the opportunity to discover different cultures as the old Mediterranean civilizations or pre-Columbian cultures.

It is a journey of about one month and a half which is divided in two stages: an American and a Spanish itinerary. Approximately 350 young people from 50 countries study the history, geography and culture of the countries they explore by visiting historical places and participating in conferences that take place during the trip. The members of the expedition live together, share tents and coexist, sometimes in uncomfortable conditions, trying to create an environment of support and respect amongst each other.
Since 1979 the route has covered more than 20 countries: Brazil, Peru, Ecuador, Venezuela, Bolivia, Mexico, Guatemala, Dominican Republic, Paraguay, Honduras and Costa Rica.

Until 1992 the program was called Adventure 92 to commemorate the centenary of the discovery of America. Since 1993 the program is named Ruta Quetzal. The project is sponsored by the King of Spain, Juan Carlos I and it was declared in 1990 of universal interest by the UNESCO.
Besides purely academic activities they are also workshops on new technologies, computer, television, journalism, photography, astronomy, diving, marine science, music and other subjects, as well as talks and discussion sessions on "Development Cooperation".

At later stages Quadra-Salcedo involved in the project his nephew, Telmo Aldaz de la Quadra-Salcedo, who then launched a similarly formatted though less ambitious project, España Rumbo al Sur.

TV career 
 Full Page (A toda plana) (1965–1967)
 Adventure (Aventura) (1969)
 The world in action (El mundo en acción) (1973–1978)
 The reporters (Los Reporteros) (1974–1976)
 Spanish in the Pacific (Españoles en el Pacífico) (1980)
 Treasure hunt (A la caza del tesoro) (1984)
 Adventure 92 (Aventura 92) (1988–1992)
 Queztal Route (Ruta Quetzal) (since 1993)

Awards 
 Ondas Awards (1973)
 Gold Aerial (1968)
 Extraordinary Gold Aerial  (2002)
 ATV Award (2004) in recognition for his professional career
 Village Journalism Award for “Three years in the Amazonas”
 TV National Award for “Managuan and the earthquake”
 TV National Award for "Camaño and naval officers"
 TV Reviews International Award in Cannes for "Che Guevara´s death"
 TC International Award for “The long walk of Etrirean people”
 Sport Merit Silver Medal
 Agricultural Merit Medal and Civil Merit Order Assignment
 Antonio José de Irisarri Order (2006)
 Ítaca Award for his career
 “Las Encartaciones” Turism Award, Vizcaya (2007)
 International Character Plus is more Award, Madrid (2010)
 Extremadura´s Medal, Mérida (2012)

Track Record and Honors as an athlete

National

Shot Put 
 Youth Champion of Spain in 1952 (12.57m)

Discus Throw 
 7 records of Spain (45.91m - 46.87m - 47.22m - 47.30m - 48.93m - 50.13m - 51.00m)
 6 times Champion of Spain in 1953 (43.05m), 1955 (44.32m), 1956 (47.41m), 1958 (45.20m), 1959 (44.68m) and 1960 (48.23m)
 Runner-up of Spain in 1952 (39.42m)
 Silver Medal in Luxembourg International Students Games in 1951 (40.58m)
 Bronze Medal in Dortmund International Students Games in 1953 (44.85m)
 Youth Champion of Spain in 1952 (42.36m)

Hammer Throw 
 7 records of Spain (47.24m - 47.54m - 47.74m - 47.79m - 48.35m - 49.11m - 49.25m)
 Champion of Spain in 1956 (49.25m)
 Runner-up of Spain in 1955 (42.69 m)

International 
 18 times absolute international
 Switzerland-Spain held in Lausanne (1951) in discus throw.
 Federal-Germany Spain held in Madrid (1954) in discus throw.
 Spain-France held in San Sebastian (1954) in shot put, discus throw and hammer throw.
 Sarre-Sarrebrucken held in Spain (1955) in shot put and discus throw.
 Spain-Luxembourg in Luxembourg (1955) in shot put and discus throw.
 Saar Spain held in Madrid (1956) in discus throw.
 Portugal-Spain in Lisbon (1956) shot put, discus throw and hammer throw.
 Southern France and Spain held in Limoux (1956) in shot put and discus throw.
 Spain-Belgium-Portugal held in Barcelona (1957) in shot put and discus throw.
 Portugal-Spain in Lisbon (1958) in discus throw.
 Belgium-Spain-Denmark in Brussels (1958) in discus throw.
 Southern France and Spain held in Monaco (1958) in discus throw.
 Spain-Portugal held in San Sebastian (1959) in discus throw.
 Austria-Spain in Vienna (1959) in discus throw.
 Spain-Switzerland held in Barcelona (1959) in discus throw.
 Switzerland-Spain-France "B" held in Geneva (1960) in discus throw.
 Bronze medal in shot put at the Ibero-American Games in Santiago, Chile, 1960 (14.72 m) and 4th place in discus throw.
 Olympic Games in Rome (1960) in discus throw.
 2 times International University Student, especially because of his performance in Turin Universiada held in Turin in 1959 in discus throw.

Personal Bests 
 Shot Put: 14.37m in Poitiers, 26 August 1956.
 Discus Throw: 51.00m in San Sebastián, 8 August 1960.
 Hammer Throw: 49.25m in Oviedo,  25 July 1956.
 Javelin Throw: 48.60m in 1958.
 Javelin Throw (Spanish Style): 82.80 m in Madrid, 21 September 1956.

References

Other sources 
VideoConference

External links

1932 births
2016 deaths
Spanish male discus throwers
Athletes (track and field) at the 1960 Summer Olympics
Olympic athletes of Spain
Spanish journalists
Recipients of the Civil Order of Alfonso X, the Wise